Richard Wilson-Smith (1852 – 12 September 1912) was a Canadian businessman and politician.

Biography 

Born in Ireland, Wilson-Smith emigrated to Canada in 1878 settling in Montreal, Quebec. A few years after arriving in Montreal, he became publisher and chief editor of the Insurance and Finance Chronicle. In 1893, he was elected to the Montreal City Council as an alderman for St. Lawrence Ward. In 1896, he was unanimously elected Mayor of Montreal for a two-year term. He ran unsuccessfully as the Conservative candidate for the House of Commons of Canada for the riding St. Lawrence in the 1896 federal election. In 1892, he became a member of the Montreal Board of Trade, and in 1898 he purchased a
seat on the Montreal Stock Exchange.

He was one of the original directors of the Lachine Rapids Hydraulic and Land Company, which undertook successfully the development of the vast water power of the Lachine Rapids. He was President of the Canada Accident Company, a trustee of the Guardian Assurance Company, Vice-President of the Montreal Trust and Deposit Company, the National Security Company of New York and resident Vice-President of the American Surety Company.

Gallery

References
 

1852 births
1912 deaths
Conservative Party of Canada (1867–1942) candidates for the Canadian House of Commons
Irish emigrants to Canada (before 1923)
Mayors of Montreal
Anglophone Quebec people
Burials at Notre Dame des Neiges Cemetery